Thorold Philip Walter Barker (born 14 August 1971) is a notable British financial journalist and author who was based in New York City before assuming the editorship of the Wall Street Journal's European Edition in March 2013.

Barker graduated from Trinity College, Cambridge.

His work first gained international recognition in 2004 when he became editor of the popular and influential Lex page of the New York bureau of the Financial Times. His work included investigative pieces on Wall Street, as well as travel writing on his intrepid trips to Africa and Antarctica. 

In June 2008, Barker moved to the Wall Street Journal to take over its 'Heard on the Street' page, amidst much media commentary on what Barker's transition said about the relative merits of both papers

References

1971 births
Living people
Alumni of Trinity College, Cambridge
British male journalists
The Wall Street Journal people